Berry M. Whitaker (October 22, 1890 – January 10, 1984) was an American college football and college basketball coach. He also organized one of the nation's first university intramural programs at The University of Texas at Austin. Whitaker served as the school's football head coach from 1920 to 1922 and as its basketball head coach for the 1920 season. Whitaker retired from coaching after the 1922 season, citing the physical toll that the stress of defeats took on him and also his desire to return to the work he most enjoyed—directing the University's intramural sports program, which he would do until 1960. The UT intramural fields were named in Whitaker's honor following their relocation and expansion in 1967. Whitaker was inducted into the Longhorn Hall of Honor in 1977.

A native of Anderson, Indiana, Whitaker played college football at Indiana University Bloomington.

Head coaching record

College football

College basketball

References

External links

1890 births
1984 deaths
Basketball coaches from Indiana
Indiana Hoosiers football players
Texas Longhorns football coaches
Texas Longhorns men's basketball coaches
High school football coaches in Texas
Sportspeople from Anderson, Indiana
Players of American football from Indiana